Yoon Soung-Min (born May 22, 1985 in South Korea) is a South Korean football midfielder whose last known club was Persijap Jepara.

Career statistics

References

External links
 Profile at Liga Indonesia Official Site

South Korean footballers
South Korean expatriate footballers
South Korean expatriate sportspeople in Indonesia
Living people
Expatriate footballers in Indonesia
1985 births
Liga 1 (Indonesia) players
Persijap Jepara players
Association football midfielders